The 2017–18 Investec Women's Hockey Premier Division season ran from 23 September 2017 until 25 March 2018 with a winter break in December and January for the Indoor season.

Regular season

Final table

Results

League Finals Weekend

Semi-finals

Final

Final details
Surbiton
Scorers: Sarah Page 8-F, Hollie Pearne-Webb 10-PC, Beckie Middleton 26-PC
Squad: Giselle Ansley, Georgie Twigg (Capt.), Jo Hunter, Hannah Martin, Emily Atkinson, Emily Defroand, Beckie Middleton, Hollie Pearne-Webb, Holly Payne, Alice Sharp, Abi Walker (GK). Subs: Sarah Page (7 mins), Robyn Collins (9), Olivia Chilton (14), Jenna Woolven (14), Anabel Herzsprung (20), Stephanie Addison (23), Ellie Shahbo (GK) (60)
Holcombe
Scorer: Heather McEwan (FG35)

EH Women's Championship Cup

Quarter-finals

Semi-finals

Final 
(Held at Lee Valley Hockey and Tennis Centre on 5 May)

Surbiton 
Scorers- (Pearne-Webb (2), Middleton (2), Page)
Squad - Giselle Ansley, Stephanie Addison, Georgie Twigg, Jo Hunter, Hannah Martin, Emily Atkinson, Olivia Chilton, Beckie Middleton, Sarah Page, Hollie Pearne-Webb, Holly Payne, Alice Sharp, Robyn Collins, Ella Burnley, Anabel Herzsprung, Ellie Shahbo
Clifton 
Squad - Sarah Ellis, Nicola Moss, Harriet Smith, Isabel Palmer, Zoe Leach, Joanna Leigh, Abigail Porter, Claire Thomas, Kate Holmes, Holly Savage, Hannah Coulson, Victoria McCabe, Elena Emo, Louisa Bell

References

2017
2017 in women's field hockey
2018 in women's field hockey
field hockey
field hockey
2017–18 in European field hockey